Kang San-eh (born Kang Yeong-geol, ; November 3, 1963) is a South Korean folk rock singer-songwriter and actor. He is sometimes referred to as the "Korean Bob Dylan."

Early life and education 
Kang was born in 1963 in Busan, South Korea. His mother had settled there during the Korean War as part of the Hungnam evacuation from North Korea in 1950. Kang has one brother and one sister.

Kang moved to Seoul in 1982 to study traditional Korean medicine at Kyung Hee University.

Career
Kang made his debut with the album Ra-gu-yo in 1993. He achieved greater success with his second album, You Can Do It, released in 1994. Since his third album, Ppittagi in 1996, he has worked with Japanese guitarist Gasga Hirohumihachi.

He had a performance for 6 days which is titled "Let's go on a picnic to the riverside and mountains" at a small theater in Daehakro, a famous spot in Seoul. Hachi and Natil, who performed percussion instruments, joined the concert with him. Recordings of the performance were put on the album "Let's go on a picnic Best Live".

He sang the single "To My Friend" (친구여) in collaboration with Bobby Kim.

Kang also sang the song "How Nice It Would Be" (얼마나 좋을까) for the 2014 Korean drama "Valid Love" starring Uhm Tae-woong, Lee Si-young and Lee Soo-hyuk.

In 2018, he sang at the 'Spring is Coming' Inter-Korean Musical Exchange in Pyongyang, North Korea. It was the first time in more than a decade that the two Koreas had hosted a significant event. Kang became emotional during his performance, stating his parents were refugees from the North, and that his concert in Pyongyang was personal.

Discography

Studio albums
 1992: Gangsan-e Vol. 0
 1994: Me at the Puberty
 1996: Ppittagi
 1998: Salmon
 2002: Kang Young-geul Vol.6
 2008: Wet towel

Compilation albums
 1997: The Essence
 1999: A morning, Remake Album
 2001: Best Live

EPs
2011: Kiss

OSTs
 2014: "How Nice It Would Be" for the Valid Love Soundtrack
 2015: "Walk slowly" for the Late Night Restaurant Soundtrack
 2016: "Today" for the My Horrible Boss Soundtrack

Videography

Movies
 1994: "To You from Me" - at music section
 2005: "Shout of Asia" - starring
 2011: "Battlefield Heroes - at music team
 2011: "Pink" - as Bang Rang Gaek / wanderer
 2013: "El Condor Pasa" - at music section
 2016: "Night Song" - as an live singer (friendship appearance)
 2016: "A Quiet Dream - as Fortune Teller (special appearance)
 2016: "Beaten Black and Blue" - cameo (friendship appearance)

TV Shows
 2004: "Happy Sunday'' as the 48th teacher of the 183 time immortal song

References

External links
 

20th-century South Korean male singers
South Korean folk rock singers
South Korean rock guitarists
People from South Gyeongsang Province
Kyung Hee University alumni
1963 births
Living people
21st-century South Korean male singers
South Korean male singer-songwriters